Zdeněk Ondřej (born 2 August 1980 is a Czech former professional ice hockey forward who played with HC Bílí Tygři Liberec in the Czech Extraliga.

References

External links

Czech ice hockey forwards
HC Bílí Tygři Liberec players
Living people
1980 births
People from Jindřichův Hradec
Sportspeople from the South Bohemian Region
HC Berounští Medvědi players
Long Beach Ice Dogs (ECHL) players
Idaho Steelheads (ECHL) players
Anchorage Aces players
HC Vítkovice players
Piráti Chomutov players
HC Dynamo Pardubice players
Orli Znojmo players
BK Mladá Boleslav players
Motor České Budějovice players
Czech expatriate ice hockey players in the United States